The  black-casqued hornbill (Ceratogymna atrata) or black-casqued wattled hornbill, is a species of hornbill in the family Bucerotidae.
It is widely spread across the African tropical rainforest.

Male and female black-casqued hornbill differ in physical appearance and are therefore an example of sexual dimorphism. The males are larger, have black feathers on their head, and have a larger casque. The females have brown hood of feathers.

References

External links
 Audio file of the sounds of the black casqued hornbill Freesound

black-casqued hornbill
Birds of the African tropical rainforest
black-casqued hornbill
Taxonomy articles created by Polbot